Winding Stair Mountain National Recreation Area is a United States national recreation area in the Ouachita National Forest. State Highway 1, known as the Talimena Scenic Byway in this area, bisects the recreation area. U. S. Highway 271 loops up through the summit.  Winding Stair Mountain National Recreation Area and the nearby Upper Kiamichi River and Black Fork Mountain Wilderness areas were created by an act of Congress on October 18, 1988.

It lies mostly within LeFlore County, Oklahoma. A  section of the Ouachita National Recreation Trail passes through the recreation area providing for diverse hiking opportunities. Other activities include camping, fishing, hunting, and hang-gliding.

Notes

See also
Talimena Scenic Drive

References

Protected areas of Le Flore County, Oklahoma
National Recreation Areas of the United States
Ouachita National Forest
Protected areas established in 1988
1988 establishments in Oklahoma
Geography of Oklahoma
Tourist attractions in Oklahoma
Environment of Oklahoma
Protected areas of Oklahoma